Desaguadero Municipality is the fourth municipal section of Ingavi Province in  La Paz Department, Bolivia. Its capital is Desaguadero.

Division 
The municipality consists of the following two cantons:
 Desaguadero - 4.194 inhabitants (2001)
 San Juan de Huancollo - 787 inhabitants

The people 
The people are predominantly indigenous citizens of Aymara descent.

Languages 
The languages spoken in the Desaguadero Municipality are mainly Aymara and Spanish.

Places of interest 
Some of the tourist attractions of the municipality are:
 The international fair of Desaguadero on the Peruvian border
 Desaguadero River with its avifauna and native Aymara and Uru communities along its banks. The river runs along the entire Altiplano.

See also 
 Janq'u Jaqhi
 Jilarata

References 

 obd.descentralizacion.gov.bo/municipal/fichas/ (inactive)

External links 
 Desaguadero Municipality: population data and map  (Spanish)

Municipalities of La Paz Department (Bolivia)